McKinley Singleton is an American former basketball player who played the guard position.

During his senior season in college with UAB in 1984, he won the Sun Belt Conference men's basketball tournament and was named the tournaments MVP.

Singleton was drafted by the Milwaukee Bucks in the sixth round of the 1984 NBA draft, but was waived by the team before the season began. He later played two games with the New York Knicks during the 1986-87 NBA season.

In 1993, he won the Canadian NBL championship with the Saskatoon Slam.

References

External links
NBA statistics at Basketball Reference
CBA statistics at statscrew.com

1961 births
Living people
Basketball players from Memphis, Tennessee
Milwaukee Bucks draft picks
New York Knicks players
Pensacola Tornados (1986–1991) players
Shooting guards
Tri-City Chinook players
Tulsa Fast Breakers players
UAB Blazers men's basketball players
Wisconsin Flyers players
American men's basketball players